Richard James Shephard MBE, DL, FRSCM (20 March 1949 – 20 February 2021) was a British composer, educator, and Director of Development and Chamberlain of York Minster. He was acclaimed as one of the most significant composers of church music of his time.

Education and musical career
Shephard was a chorister at Gloucester Cathedral, where the organist was then the composer Herbert Sumsion before taking a degree at Corpus Christi College, Cambridge. While at Cambridge, Shephard studied under composer David Willcocks, Hugh Macdonald, the great expert on Berlioz, and Alan Ridout. He started his musical career as a lay vicar in Salisbury Cathedral Choir, and at this time was Conductor of the Salisbury Grand Opera Group, the Farrant Singers, Guest Conductor of the Salisbury Orchestral Society and Musical Director of various productions at the Salisbury Playhouse. It was at this time when he was greatly influenced by Richard Seal and Lionel Dakers, the former director of the Royal School of Church Music. An article published in 1987 in the Musical Times by Dakers, The RSCM: Past, Present...and Future, states that "Our policy is to provide music of quality and interest for every contingency which can then be absorbed into a choir's working repertory. Aston, Oxley, How, Shephard, and Sumsion feature in our catalogue because they measure up to these needs, produce what we want and what we can consequently sell in large numbers." Years later, in 2000, Shephard and Dakers would both contribute to The IAO Millennium Book, Thirteen essays About the Organ, a publication which comprises contemporary writings related to the organ and written by distinguished composers of the day. Shephard's article was entitled Composing for the Church today, in which he discussed current demands on church music composers in the 20th century. His first opera, The Turncoat was composed for the Salisbury International Arts Festival.

As a composer, he wrote operas, operettas, musicals, orchestral works, music for television, and chamber music but was perhaps best known for his choral works which are sung extensively around the world today, especially in churches and cathedrals in England and America. His compositions are frequently broadcast in the United Kingdom.

Shephard received commissions from numerous associations including the Three Choirs Festival, the Southern Cathedrals Festival, Woodard Schools, the Goldsmiths' Company and the Ryedale Festival. He was a Visiting Fellow at York University's music department and a Visiting Professor in the Music department of the University of the South (Sewanee); he has received honorary doctorates from both. For his "outstanding contribution to church music" he was awarded a Lambeth degree in music, and, in 2009, was granted Freedom of the City of York. Recently, he has had a place on the "Archbishop's Commission on Church Music" and on the "Church Music Commission on Cathedrals". Shephard was also a Fellow of the Royal School of Church Music, the highest honour which the RSCM offer.

In November 2009, Shephard was commissioned to write a piece for the commemoration of Henry Purcell's three hundred and fiftieth birthday by The National Centre of Early Music, Ode on the 350th Birthday of Mr Henry Purcell. The piece was performed in the Royal Albert Hall by five hundred school children who make up the Scunthorpe Co-operative Junior Choir which won the BBC Radio 3 Choir of the Year in 2008. Howard Goodall co-hosted the event.

In 1999 Shephard received a commission to write for the York Mystery Plays Millennium and in 2008 he coauthored York Minster: A Living Legacy with the Dean of York, Keith Jones, and Louise Ann Hampson.

Career in education
As well as Shephard's prolific musical career, he also had a distinguished career in education. He became Head of Music at Godolphin School at the early age of 24, and then Deputy Head at Salisbury Cathedral School. In 1985, he moved to York, becoming headmaster of York Minster School and later became Chamberlain of York Minster. He remained headmaster of the school until 2004 when he stepped down, and was then Director of Development at York Minster, co-ordinating fundraising, and raising more than £20 million to restore the Great East Window. He was Chamberlain, in this role he served as cantor at evensong and mattins, leading the responses.

He was appointed MBE in the 2012 Queen's Birthday Honours list for his services to music and education. In the same year he was appointed a Deputy Lieutenant of North Yorkshire.

He died on 20 February 2021 at the age of 71, one month short of his 72nd birthday.

Selected works

Choral
Eucharistic settings:
The Addington Service
The Wiltshire Service
Gloucester Cathedral
Tisbury Service
The Woodard Service
The St Matthew's Service (for St Matthew's Church, Northampton)

Magnificat & Nunc Dimittis, for:
Salisbury Cathedral
Hereford Cathedral
Liverpool Cathedral
Lionel Dakers in memoriam
Llandaff Cathedral
Gloucester Cathedral

Anthems
Let us now praise famous men
The old order changeth
Ye choirs of new Jerusalem
The strife is o’er
A Vision of Wheels
O for a thousand tongues
Last verses
Never weather beaten sail
Jesu dulcis memoria
And didst thou travel light
The birds
Prayer for a new mother
Let him who seeks
We give immortal praise
And when the builders 
Open for me the gates of righteousness
Lord I have loved the habitation of thy house
Adam lay y-bounden
Who shall ascend
Te Deum
Out of the stillness
The Secret of Christ
Crossing the bar
Jubilate Deo (for the celebrations on the 450th anniversary of the founding of Christ College, Brecon)

Opera
The Turncoat
The Dove and the Eagle
Caedmon
Good King Wenceslas
The Shepherds' Play
St Nicholas

Musicals
All for Alice
The Phantom Tollbooth
Wind in the Willows
Pride and Prejudice
Solemn Parody
Ernest
A Christmas Carol
Eek!
Emil and the Detectives

Orchestral
Overture – Mayday
The Musicians of Bremen
Six Shakespeare Songs
Guildhall March

Oratorio
Jonah
Requiem
St Luke Passion
There Was Such Beauty (1991, Gloucester Cathedral)
Christmas cantata
Purcell birthday cantata (for the Albert Hall Schools Prom 2009)

References

External links
 http://www.sjmp.com (St. James Music Press)
 https://www.rscmshop.com/rscm-composers/richard-shephard.html (The Royal School of Church Music)
 

1949 births
2021 deaths
Alumni of Corpus Christi College, Cambridge
British composers
Deputy Lieutenants of North Yorkshire
Heads of schools in England
Members of the Order of the British Empire
Place of birth missing
Place of death missing